Eurybia is a Neotropical genus of metalmark butterflies found from Mexico to Bolivia.

Description
The body is very slender, the head small, the thorax long, the abdomen in both sexes bilaterally compressed, thin and pointed. The wings are entire, the hindwings with a round border, only in a somewhat deviating group the forewings are pointed falciformly at the apex. The ground colour is above dark brown, the border of the hindwing often with a ruddle-red tinge. Only in one case (Eurybia latifasciata (Hewitson, 1870) the wing is traversed by a broad white band (in a species flying together with just the same banded species of other genera (Mesosemia). The forewings mostly exhibit at the cell-end an eyespot or ringspot.
Head broad, forehead broad and flat, eyes of medium size, naked, slightly convex, palpi bent up in front of the face, not projecting, but often brightly coloured; second joint more than twice as long as the first one, the third a minute knob. Antennae very long, reaching about two thirds of the costa, thin, at the ends scarcely thickened. Thorax slender, legs short, the legs, on being stretched out, scarcely reach the anus; abdomen long and slim, mostly extending considerably beyond the anal angle. Wings broad, in the forewing the subcostal is five branched, the submedian bifurcated at the base, the cell broad, cuneiform, of different shapes, at the end sometimes more straightly cut off, sometimes angled laciniformly. The hindwings are sometimes slightly angled between the upper and middle radial-ends.

Species
Listed alphabetically:
Eurybia albiseriata Weymer, 1890
Eurybia caerulescens Druce, 1904 – bluish eurybia or Druce's underleaf
Eurybia carolina Godart, [1824]
Eurybia cyclopia Stichel, 1910 – fire-bordered eurybia
Eurybia dardus (Fabricius, 1787) – Dardus eurybia, Dardus underleaf
Eurybia donna C. & R. Felder, 1862
Eurybia elvina Stichel, 1910 – Elvina eurybia or blind eurybia
Eurybia franciscana C. & R. Felder, 1862
Eurybia halimede (Hübner, [1807]) – Halimede eurybia
Eurybia jemima Hewitson, 1869 – Jemima Eeurybia
Eurybia juturna C. & R. Felder, 1865
Eurybia latifasciata (Hewitson, 1870)
Eurybia lycisca Westwood, 1851 – blue-winged eurybia
Eurybia misellivestis Stichel, 1910
Eurybia molochina Stichel, 1910 – Molochina eurybia, Molochina underleaf
Eurybia nicaeus (Fabricius, 1775) – Nicaeus eurybia
Eurybia patrona Weymer, 1875 – great eurybia
Eurybia pergaea (Geyer, 1832)
Eurybia rubeolata Stichel, 1910 – rubeolata eurybia
Eurybia silaceana Stichel, 1924
Eurybia unxia Godman & Salvin, [1885] – Unxia eurybia or azure-winged eurybia

References

External links
Eurybia at tol

Riodininae
Riodinidae of South America
Butterfly genera
Taxa named by Johann Karl Wilhelm Illiger